The 2020–21 Western Sydney Wanderers season was the club's ninth season since its establishment in 2012. The club participated in the A-League for the ninth time.

Pre-season
The Western Sydney Wanderers started the season with Jean-Paul de Marigny as their head coach after he was appointed in July permanently, following an interim session after the sacking of Markus Babbel. Three months after his appointment, Wanderers announced de Marigny's sacking with no explanation. On 15 October 2020, the Wanderers announced the signing of Carl Robinson from Newcastle Jets as de Marigny's replacement.

Players

First team squad

Transfers

From youth squad

Transfers in

Transfers out

Contract extensions

Pre-season and friendlies

Competitions

Overview

Clean sheets

References 

Western Sydney Wanderers FC seasons
2020–21 A-League season by team